Packwaukee is an unincorporated census-designated place located in the town of Packwaukee, Marquette County, Wisconsin, United States. Packwaukee has a post office with ZIP code 53953. As of the 2010 census, its population was 262.

Images

References

Census-designated places in Marquette County, Wisconsin
Census-designated places in Wisconsin